Inogatran (INN) is a low molecular weight peptidomimetic thrombin inhibitor. Inogatran was developed for the potential treatment of arterial and venous thrombotic diseases.

References

Direct thrombin inhibitors
Guanidines
Cyclohexyl compounds